In the southern Philippines, tagonggo or tagunggo is a type of music traditionally played by male musicians dressed in their festive fineries. 
It is considered to be outdoor music, while the related kulintang ensemble, by contrast, is chamber music. The main instrument of tagonggo music is the tagunggoan, from which it takes its name. The tagunggoan consists of six to eight hanging gongs in a pentatonic scale. 

In addition, the instrumental ensemble consists of a number of medium-sized gongs called mamalala; several small, high pitched, and shallow gongs called pong; one or more tambor (snare drums); and one or more garagara or panda'opan (cymbals). The last two are either of Chinese or European origin. Tagonggo is associated with the Sama, Bajau, and Tausug ethnicities of the Sulu archipelago. 

Occasions or purposes for playing tagonggo include sending off or welcoming dignitaries, honorific serving of betel quid, and wedding celebrations. Tagonggo players go at the head of the parade either on foot or aboard a vehicle or motorboat. Tagonggo is also played in ceremonies called kalilang sa tong to appeal to the spirits for a bountiful harvest or for a rich catch of fish.

See also
Pangalay

References
See also: The Maranao Man.  Mindanao Art and Culture, Number Four (1980);  Marawi City: University Research Center, Mindanao State University; 130pp.

Gongs
Pitched percussion instruments
Philippine folk instruments